Hegewisch  is a commuter rail station in the city of Chicago, Illinois in the Hegewisch neighborhood, that serves the South Shore Line north to Millennium Station and east to the cities of Hammond, East Chicago, Gary, Michigan City, and South Bend, Indiana. The Hegewisch station has high-level platforms, as part of NICTD's continuing effort to comply with the Americans with Disabilities Act of 1990.

Hegewisch is the South Shore Line's easternmost stop in Chicago and the last one in Illinois outbound, and offers pay parking. It is the only Illinois station on the South Shore Line not shared with the Metra Electric Line. There is a unique arrangement at the station as far as fares are concerned: although this station is a South Shore Line stop and the tracks are owned by NICTD, the station and the parking lots are actually owned by Metra and thus subject to Metra's fares, because the station is within the state of Illinois. Thus, when the South Shore Line adjusts its fares, the fares for Hegewisch do not change, but if Metra adjusts its fares, the fares at Hegewisch are adjusted accordingly.

Having broken ground in July 1991, current station facility was officially opened June 2, 1992. The station has a 3,000 square foot building, and cost Metra $1.7 million to construct. Soon after the current station building opened, the former station facility (located approximately 1,500 feet west of the current one) was demolished.

The station is just west of an at-grade junction with a former Pennsylvania Railroad branch line (ex-South Chicago & Southern). The line began at the main line near the Illinois–Indiana state line and continued to a connection with the line to Logansport, Indiana. As of 2011, the tracks only exist to the former New York Central Railroad (ex-Michigan Central) line.

The Chicago and Western Indiana Railroad main line (carrying trains of the Erie, Monon, Chicago and Eastern Illinois, and Wabash railroads) ran parallel to the South Shore. The Nickel Plate Railroad also had its main line to the west of the C&WI.

A station typology adopted by the Chicago Plan Commission on October 16, 2014, assigns the Hegewisch station a typology of Mixed Residential/Industrial Neighborhood (MRIN). This typology is an area in which the Metra station serves both residential and industrial uses. Like most of the MRIN stations, it does not have access to CTA rail.

Bus connections
CTA
  30 South Chicago 

Pace
  355 Wentworth Limited (Weekday rush hour service) 
  358 Torrence 
  364 159th Street (Weekend service only)

References

External links
 
 South Shore Line - Stations
 Hegewisch Station (South Shore Railfan.net)
 South Shore Schedule (Hegewisch.net)

South Shore Line stations in Illinois
Railway stations in Chicago
Railway stations in the United States opened in 1992